The 2016–17 National Basketball League (Czech Republic) season was the 24th season of the Czech NBL.

Format
Teams in regular season play home and away against every other team in a round-robin tournament, before being split into two groups of six teams for playing again home and away against the teams from the same group.

After the end of the stage after the first split, the six teams from to top group and the two first qualified teams from the bottom group joined the play-offs.

The other four teams would play again home and away against themselves for avoiding the relegation.

Regular season

Playoffs
Seeded teams played at home games 1, 2, 5 and 7, while the finals and the third place game where played with a double-legged series, playing the seeded team the second match at home.

Clubs in European competitions

Clubs in international competitions

External links
NBL official website 

Czech Republic
Basketball
National Basketball League (Czech Republic)